Frío River (Spanish: Río Frío) is a river of Costa Rica, Alajuela province. The last few kilometers it passes through Nicaragua.

References

Rivers of Costa Rica
Rivers of Nicaragua
International rivers of North America